
Gmina Borek Wielkopolski is an urban-rural gmina (administrative district) in Gostyń County, Greater Poland Voivodeship, in west-central Poland.

Villages
Apart from the town of Borek Wielkopolski, Gmina Borek Wielkopolski contains the villages and settlements of Bolesławów, Bruczków, Celestynów, Cielmice, Dąbrówka, Domanice, Dorotów, Frasunek, Głoginin, Grodnica, Jawory, Jawory PGR, Karolew, Koszkowo, Leonów, Liż, Maksymilianów, Osówiec, Siedmiorogów Drugi, Siedmiorogów Pierwszy, Skoków, Skokówko, Stawiszyn, Strumiany, Studzianna, Trzecianów, Trzecianów Osiedle, Ustronie, Wycisłowo, Wygoda, Zacisze, Zalesie and Zimnowoda.

Neighbouring gminas
Gmina Borek Wielkopolski is bordered by the gminas of Dolsk, Jaraczewo, Koźmin Wielkopolski, Piaski and Pogorzela.

References
Polish official population figures 2006

Borek Wielkopolski
Gostyń County